The Peugeot 301 is a Subcompact (B-segment) sedan produced by the French automaker Peugeot since 2012. It was announced to the public in May 2012, with an official launch that took place at the Paris Motor Show in September. The 301 is built at Peugeot's Vigo plant in Spain, alongside its twin Citroën C-Elysée, and has been manufactured in China since November 2013. It is also assembled as a CKD in other markets such as Kazakhstan and Nigeria.

Sales of the 301 commenced in November 2012, initially in Turkey, and later in other markets in Western Asia (Taiwan since 2016), Africa, Latin America, Central Europe and Eastern Europe. Designed specifically for emerging markets, the 301 is not sold in core Western European markets (with the exception of French Overseas Departments/Regions and Collectivities) or RHD markets.

Specification

Name
The model's 301 name was first used on a 1932 Peugeot 301, and the new 301 is the first Peugeot to start the revised naming strategy of using x01 and x08 to denote emerging market models and traditional market models.

2017 facelift 
In 2017, Peugeot 301 received a facelift alongside its twin sister C-Elysée, the new front fascia includes a modification of the headlamps, a new grille on which displays the Peugeot logo instead of the bonnet, and DRLs (Daytime Running Lights).

The new facelift also added as an option a touchscreen multimedia radio with Android Auto and Apple CarPlay.

Other version

Citroën C-Elysée

A similar model to the 301, badged as a Citroën C-Elysée, was also launched at the Paris Motor Show in 2012.

IKCO Tara

Safety
It has front disc brakes.

Latin NCAP
The Spanish-made 301 in its most basic Latin American configuration with 4 airbags received 3 stars for adult occupants and 3 stars for toddlers from Latin NCAP in 2019.

Euro NCAP
The 301 in its standard European configuration received 3 stars from Euro NCAP in 2014.

Sales and production

301

C-Elysée

Notes

References

External links

301
Compact cars
Front-wheel-drive vehicles
Euro NCAP small family cars
Latin NCAP small family cars
Cars introduced in 2012
2010s cars